Allomengea dentisetis is a species of sheetweb spider in the family Linyphiidae. It is found in North America as well as a range of Russia (Siberia to Far East), Kyrgyzstan, China, Mongolia, and Japan.

References

Linyphiidae
Articles created by Qbugbot
Spiders described in 1861